The Katyn Commission or the International Katyn Commission was a committee formed in April 1943 under request by Germany to investigate the Katyn massacre of some 22,000 Polish nationals during the Soviet occupation of Eastern Poland, mostly prisoners of war from the September Campaign including Polish Army officers, intelligentsia, civil servants, priests, police officers and numerous other professionals. Their bodies were discovered in a series of large mass graves in the forest near Smolensk in Russia following Operation Barbarossa.

An international commission of experts in anatomy and forensic pathology were brought in from 11 countries in Europe, predominantly from Nazi Germany's allied or occupied states.  The Commission concluded that the Soviet Union had been responsible for the massacre. Consequently, the German government made extensive reference to the massacre in its own propaganda in an attempt to drive a political wedge between the Allies of World War II alliance. The severing of relations between the Polish government-in-exile and the Soviet Union was a direct result of Polish support for the investigation.

The Soviets denied their responsibility for the crime immediately, and their Extraordinary State Commission was tasked with falsifying documents and forensic science in order to reverse the blame and charged Germany with the crime.

Members

, Romanian doctor of medicine
Herman Maximilien de Burlet, Dutch anatomist, embryologist, physiologist and pathologist
, Czech professor of forensic medicine
, Bulgarian professor of forensic medicine
Eduard Miloslavić, Croatian professor of pathology
Professor François Naville from University of Geneva
Dr.  from the University of Budapest
, Italian professor of forensic medicine, University of Naples
, Finnish pathologist, professor of the Helsinki University
Professor  of the Ghent University in Belgium 
, Danish expert in forensic medicine
Andrej Žarnov (František Šubík), Slovak professor of pathological anatomy

Russian admission of the Soviet crime

The Soviet documents pertaining to the massacre started being declassified only in 1990. They proved conclusively that 21,857 Polish internees and prisoners of war were executed by the Soviet Union after 3 April 1940 including 14,552 prisoners from three largest Soviet POW camps at this time. Of the total number of victims, 4,421 officers were executed by shooting at the Kozelsk Optina Monastery, 3,820 at the Starobelsk POW camp, and 6,311 at the Ostashkov facility, in addition to 7,305 Poles who were secretly executed in Byelorussian SSR and Ukrainian SSR prisons. Among the victims were 14 Polish generals including Leon Billewicz, Bronisław Bohatyrewicz, Xawery Czernicki (admiral), Stanisław Haller, Aleksander Kowalewski, Henryk Minkiewicz, Kazimierz Orlik-Łukoski, Konstanty Plisowski, Rudolf Prich (murdered in Lviv), Franciszek Sikorski, Leonard Skierski, Piotr Skuratowicz, Mieczysław Smorawiński and Alojzy Wir-Konas (promoted posthumously).

In November 2010, the Russian State Duma admitted in an official declaration that Joseph Stalin and Soviet officials ordered the Soviet NKVD secret police under Lavrentiy Beria to commit the massacres.

References

Criminal investigation
1943 establishments in Germany
Katyn massacre investigators